Francis Martin "Fra" Fee (born 20 May 1987) is an Irish actor and singer. He is known for portraying Courfeyrac in Tom Hooper's film adaptation of Les Misérables. He portrayed the role of Michael Carney in Jez Butterworth's The Ferryman at the Royal Court Theatre, West End and Broadway directed by Sam Mendes, for which he won the 2018 WhatsOnStage Award for Best Supporting Actor in a Play. In 2021 he played Kazi in the Disney+ series Hawkeye, set in the Marvel Cinematic Universe.

Background 
Fee, born in Dungannon, County Tyrone, Northern Ireland and raised in rural Killyman, attended school at St Patrick's Academy, Dungannon, performed regularly with Bardic Theatre in his early days before taking up music at the University of Manchester. He subsequently studied at the Royal Academy of Music, graduating in 2009. In 2014 Fee was made an Associate of the Royal Academy of Music.

Career 
Fee appeared in numerous productions at Belfast's Grand Opera House in conjunction with the Welsh National Opera, including The Beggar's Opera, The Mikado, Sweeney Todd, as well as a production of The Elixir of Love as Nemorino, directed by John Doyle. In 2004, he was a guest soloist for Irish tenor Ronan Tynan in Tynan's Dublin concert, titled "The Impossible Dream". Immediately following his graduation from the Royal Academy of Music, Fee was cast as Billy Kostecki in the West End production of Dirty Dancing.

He played Schlomo in the RTÉ Irish tour of Fame, before essaying the title role in Aladdin at Dublin's Gaiety Theatre. From June 2011 to 2012 he played Jean Prouvaire, and covered the roles of Marius and Enjolras in Les Misérables at the Queens Theatre, London. During his time in the West End production, Fee was cast as Courfeyrac in Tom Hooper's film Les Misérables, starring alongside Hugh Jackman as Jean Valjean and Russell Crowe as Javert.

From November to December 2012, Fee played Florizel in Howard Goodall's professional world premiere of A Winter's Tale.

Fee played Young Buddy in Stephen Sondheim's Follies at the Toulon Opera in March 2013, before playing Robbie in A Man of No Importance for Salisbury Playhouse.

On 16 June 2013, he portrayed Henrik Egerman in a special concert performance of Sondheim's A Little Night Music at the Yvonne Arnaud Theatre in Guildford, starring alongside Janie Dee, David Birell and Joanna Riding. On 2 August 2013, Fee was a guest soloist for BBC Radio 2's Friday Night Is Music Night singing America's Greatest Broadway Hits.

Fee starred in the title role of Candide at the Menier Chocolate Factory in London, alongside Scarlett Strallen as Cunegonde and David Thaxton as Maximillian, from 23 November 2013 to 22 February 2014. He later starred as Philip Ashley in Dublin's Gate Theatre production of Dame Daphne du Maurier's My Cousin Rachel, adapted for the stage by Joseph O'Connor at the Dock Street Theatre in Charleston, South Carolina as part of the Spoleto Festival USA from 22 May to 8 June 2014. In September 2014, he filmed the role of Kieran in Tom Lawes' forthcoming psychological thriller Monochrome, starring Jo Woodcock, Cosmo Jarvis and James Cosmo.

On 26 January 2015, Fee reprised the role of Henrik Egerman in A Little Night Music for one night only at the Palace Theatre in London's West End, reunited with previous co-stars Janie Dee as Desiree, David Birell as Frederick, Joanna Riding as Countess Malcolm as well as new cast members Jamie Parker as Carl Magnus and Anne Reid as Madame Armfeldt.

Fee made his Shakespeare debut as Romeo in Dublin's Gate Theatre's production of Romeo and Juliet directed by Wayne Jordan from March 2015 to May 2015.

In June 2015, Fee returned to Belfast to take up the role of Jamie in a production of Jason Robert Brown's The Last Five Years directed by Stephen Whitson, working alongside fellow West End actress Amy Lennox.

From September 2015 to 5 March 2016, Fee played the role of Amiens in Polly Findlay's production of As You Like It at the National Theatre in London starring Rosalie Craig as Rosalind. During this period he also played Man 2 in Stephen Sondheim's revue Putting It Together at the Lyric Theatre, Belfast, directed by Stephen Whitson (December 2015).

Fra played the role of Mole in the new musical adaptation of The Wind in the Willows with music by George Stiles, lyrics by Anthony Drewe and a book by Julian Fellowes in a production that starred Rufus Hound as Toad from August to November 2016.

In April 2017, he originated the role of Michael Carney in The Ferryman at the Royal Court Theatre, ahead of a transfer to the Gielgud Theatre in the West End. Fra played his final performance in the West End production on 6 January 2018. For his performance as Michael Carney in The Ferryman Fra was awarded the 2018 WhatsOnStage Award for Best Supporting Actor in a Play.

In the spring of 2018 he filmed the role of Jim in the movie adaptation of Emma Jane Unsworth's novel Animals, directed by Sophie Hyde, starring alongside Holliday Grainger and Alia Shawkat. Filming took place in Dublin. The film premiered at the 2019 Sundance Film Festival.

He performed the role of Chip in John Wilson's production of Leonard Bernstein's On The Town on 25 August 2018 at the Royal Albert Hall, having performed two weeks earlier in the same venue as one of the Jets in John Wilson's production of West Side Story.

Fra reprised his role in the Broadway transfer of The Ferryman in New York alongside most of the original cast as well as newcomer to the play Fionnula Flanagan. The play won the Tony Award for Best Original Play at the 2019 Tony Awards. During his time in New York, Fra made his New York cabaret debut at 54 Below performing his show Seisún.

Fra plays William Bogue in Irish horror-comedy Boys From County Hell written and directed by Chris Baugh, due to premiere at TriBeCa Film Festival 2020. He plays Fergus in Irish Western Thriller Pixie, alongside Alec Baldwin, Olivia Cooke and Ben Hardy.

In June 2019, Fra took part in a semi-staged concert version of The Clockmaker's Daughter, a musical by Michael Webborn and Daniel Finn, in which Fra also plays the same character in the studio cast recording, performing alongside Christine Allado and John-Owen Jones.

From October to December 2019, Fee replaced actor Colin Morgan in the role of Owen in the National Theatre's production of Brian Friel's Translations, directed by Ian Rickson, alongside Ciarán Hinds, Seamus O’Hara and Judith Roddy.

On 21 March 2022, Fee took over the role of The Emcee in Cabaret at The Playhouse Theatre, starring alongside Amy Lennox.

Personal life 
Fee is gay. He is in a romantic relationship with actor and singer Declan Bennett, with whom he lives in rural Oxfordshire.

Filmography

Theatre credits

Awards and reviews

Reviewing Candide for The New York Times, Ben Brantley wrote that "Mr. Fee proved himself a most ingenious practitioner of ingenuousness, with a glorious tenor voice." Also reviewing for Candide Libby Purves noted that "Fra Fee from Dungannon is a real find: innocent elfin face but a voice so deep, honeyed and flawless that your heart melts. Reviewing My Cousin Rachel at the Dock Street Theatre, Charleston, Debra Charlton wrote "Playing the protagonist of this taut drama, Fra Fee portrays Philip's tormented journey through desire, guilt and suspicion with keen sensitivity and detail. His tour de force performance demonstrates immense emotional range and admirable control." "Fra Fee as Philip Ashley does most of the heavy lifting in My Cousin Rachel. Rarely offstage during the entire two-plus-hour performance, Fee's stamina is incredible. Without melodrama, he convincingly portrays his character's appropriately gothic emotional swings and perfectly captures Philip's tragic flaw of youthful impulsiveness."

References

External links

 Spotlight profile. Retrieved 26 June 2014

1987 births
Living people
Male musical theatre actors from Northern Ireland
Male stage actors from Northern Ireland
Male film actors from Northern Ireland
People from County Tyrone 
Alumni of the University of Manchester
Alumni of the Royal Academy of Music
21st-century male actors from Northern Ireland
20th-century LGBT people
21st-century LGBT people
Irish gay actors